Coon Creek is a stream in Jefferson County, Nebraska, in the United States.

Coon Creek was named from the abundance of raccoons living in the nearby trees.

See also
List of rivers of Nebraska

References

Rivers of Jefferson County, Nebraska
Rivers of Nebraska